Cerro Armazones Observatory (Spanish: Observatorio Cerro Armazones, OCA; German: Observatorium Cerro Armazones, OCA) was an astronomical observatory owned and operated jointly by the Ruhr University Bochum (RUB) and the Catholic University of the North (UCN). It was established in 1995 on the slopes of Cerro Armazones, a mountain in the Antofagasta Region of Chile. Unlike many other observatories, OCA is not located at the highest point of its host mountain. This location has been given up due to the vicinity of the ELT construction site in January 2014. The Telescopes of the Bochum university, installed after 2006, are no longer operational. They are located  further to the west and  higher than the original OCA observatory, on a subsidiary peak of Cerro Armazones, Cerro Murphy. The coordinates here are those of this summit now.

On 26 April 2010, the European Southern Observatory Council selected Cerro Armazones as the site for the planned European Extremely Large Telescope. Currently the mountain top is flattened for this purpose and a new access road has been built.

Telescopes

 The  Hexapod-Telescope reflector is named for its unusual mount, consisting of six high-precision struts supporting a platform to which the telescope is attached.  It was developed and tested by RUB in Germany, and moved to Cerro Armazones in 2006.
 A  Newtonian telescope made by Halfmann Teleskoptechnik was installed by UCN in 1995. It has been dismounted in the meanwhile due to the vicinity to the ELT construction site and is currently at ESO Paranal for refurbishing.
 The  Infra Red Imaging Survey telescope is a Nasmyth reflecting telescope on an alt-azimuth mount.  It was made by Halfmann Teleskoptechnik and installed in 2010.
 A  reflector made by Meade Instruments is owned by UCN. It has been dismounted in the meanwhile due to the vicinity to the ELT construction site and is currently at UCN downtown in Antofagasta to be installed in a new dome near Sirius in the campus for public activities.
 The  Berlin Exoplanet Search Telescope II (BESTII) reflector made by Takahashi Seisakusho was installed in 2007 and is owned by the DLR Institute for Planetary Research.
 The Robotic Bochum Twin Telescope (RoBoTT - former VYSOS-6) telescopes are two  refractors made by Takahashi Seisakusho on a common German equatorial mount.
 The Bochum Monitoring Telescope (BMT) telescopes is a  Newton reflector.

See also
 Extremely Large Telescope
 Lists of telescopes
 List of astronomical observatories
 List of highest astronomical observatories
 Other observatories in Chile:
 Llano de Chajnantor Observatory 
Atacama Large Millimeter Array)
 Paranal Observatory
 Very Large Telescope
 La Silla Observatory
 Cerro Tololo Inter-American Observatory

References

External links 
Astronomisches Institut at Ruhr-Universität Bochum
Instituto de Astronomía at Universidad Católica del Norte

Astronomical observatories in Chile
Buildings and structures in Antofagasta Region
European Southern Observatory
1995 establishments in Chile